Hofman Hill is an ice-free peak,  high, standing at the north side of the terminus of Blackwelder Glacier, on the Scott Coast of Victoria Land, Antarctica. It was named by the Advisory Committee on Antarctic Names in 1992 after Robert J. Hofman, a biologist at the Marine Mammal Commission, Washington, D.C., from 1975, who conducted seal studies in 12 visits to Antarctica in the 1960s and 1970s. He was the U.S. Representative to the Scientific Committee for the Conservation of Antarctic Marine Living Resources, 1983–86.

References

Mountains of Victoria Land
Scott Coast